The Columbus and Western Railway (C&W) is a historic railroad that operated in Georgia, United States.

Organized in 1880, the C&W was founded to connect Columbus, Georgia, to Birmingham, Alabama.  The same year, the C&W started by purchasing the Savannah and Memphis Railroad, which ran  between Opelika and Goodwater, Alabama.  Two years later, it purchased a  branch of the Western Railroad of Alabama between Columbus and Opelika.  In 1888, the C&W constructed the final leg of the line from Goodwater to Birmingham and later that year merged into the Savannah and Western Railroad.

References

Predecessors of the Central of Georgia Railway
Defunct Georgia (U.S. state) railroads
Railway companies established in 1880
Railway companies disestablished in 1888
Defunct Alabama railroads
1880 establishments in Georgia (U.S. state)